Echinanthera is a genus of snakes of the family Colubridae.

Species
 Echinanthera cephalomaculata Di Bernardo, 1994
 Echinanthera cephalostriata Di Bernardo, 1996
 Echinanthera cyanopleura (Cope, 1885)
 Echinanthera melanostigma (Wagler, 1824)
 Echinanthera undulata (Wied, 1824)

References 

Echinanthera
Snake genera
Taxa named by Edward Drinker Cope